James Arthur Nielsen (August 6, 1938 – April 4, 2018) was a Canadian politician. He served in the Legislative Assembly of British Columbia from 1975 to 1986 as a Social Credit member for the constituency of Richmond.

He was appointed to Cabinet as the first Minister of Environment.  He then held the post of Consumer and Corporate Affairs, and served as Minister of Health from 1981 to 1986 .  He was given the additional duties as Minister of Human Resources for a period of time, which reflected the support he had from Premier Bill Bennett.   He was considered "tough, but fair" by his supporters and critics alike.    He was referred to as "The Fonz" by Premier Bill Bennett due to his hairdo and sideburns.  After leaving office he served as the Chairman of the Workers Compensation Board of British Columbia from 1987 to 1989.

Before entering politics Nielsen was a broadcaster for CFAX, CFUN & CJOR. He ran in the 1974 federal election as a Progressive Conservative candidate in the riding of Burnaby—Seymour.

References

1938 births
2018 deaths
British Columbia Social Credit Party MLAs
Canadian radio personalities
Health ministers of British Columbia
Progressive Conservative Party of Canada candidates for the Canadian House of Commons
Candidates in the 1974 Canadian federal election
Members of the Executive Council of British Columbia
People from Moose Jaw